Birken may refer to:

 Birken, British Columbia, an unincorporated community in southern British Columbia, Canada
 Birkenhead River in BC, Canada
 Birkenhead Peak, a mountain near the river of the same name in BC, Canada
 Birken Lake in BC, Canada
 Birken Forest Buddhist Monastery, a Buddhist monastery near Kamloops, BC, Canada
 Birkebeinerrennet, a long-distance cross-country ski race in Norway
 Birken, Radevormwald, near Radevormwald, Germany
 Birken, Morsbach, near Morsbach, Germany

People with the surname
 Sigmund von Birken, German author, member of the Fruitbearing Society

German-language surnames